Wendy Kinnard (born 23 March 1959) is a former Senator of Jersey, and was the island's Home Affairs Minister from 2005 until 2008.

Biography
Jersey-born Kinnard gained a BA (Hons) in applied Applied Social Sciences, and a Dip.H.E. in Social and Environmental Problems from the Open University.

She has been past chairwoman of Jersey Women’s Refuge, involved in  Jersey Women’s Aid, a member of Network against Abuse and Violence in the Home, a trustee of the Spring Trust, a past member of the Youth Panel 1993-1996

She is a member of Liberty and the Open University Alumni Association.

She was first elected to the States of Jersey in 1996, gaining a Senatorial seat in fourth place at her first attempt at election.

She was President of the Legislation Committee (from 1999), and vice-president of Home Affairs, taking over the Presidency of that Committee in 2002 after Alastair Layzell failed to be re-elected to the States.

She was nominated to the position of Home Affairs Minister on December 5, 2005 following the 2005 Jersey elections by the newly elected Chief Minister of Jersey.

On 1 June 2007, she announced that she would not be seeking re-election when her current mandate ended in 2008. On 21 October 2008 she resigned her ministerial post.

References

Sources 
Jersey Evening Post
Election Manifesto
Information from States of Jersey

1959 births
Living people
Government ministers of Jersey
Alumni of the Open University
Senators of Jersey
Women government ministers of Jersey
20th-century British women politicians
21st-century British women politicians